Marcelo Augusto Silva Serrano (born 29 November 1979), known as Marcelo Serrano, is a Brazilian  association footballer manager who worked as head coach of Austin Bold FC

Coaching career

Brazil (Campeonato Brasileiro Série A, Campeonato Brasileiro Série B) 

Serrano has a Brazilian and US coaching career. Serrano was named technical director, head coach and assistant coach for Joinville Esporte Clube (Joinville SC) of the Campeonato Brasileiro Série B in 2012, occasionally serving as the interim head coach of the squad that would win the Copa Santa Catarina championship.

The following year, Serrano joined Coritiba Foot Ball Club (Coritiba FC) as the technical coach 

Serrano won a third straight state championship in 2014  with Esporte Clube Bahia, as an assistant coach.

United States Virgin Islands national soccer team 

Serrano was hired in 2018 as the head coach and general manager of the U.S. Virgin Islands men's senior national team ahead of World Cup qualifiers, the CONCACAF Gold Cup, and the CONCACAF Nations Cup.

Austin Bold FC 

Serrano was introduced as the first head coach in Austin Bold FC history on 3 August 2018, which is the American second tier.

Coaching statistics

References

1979 births
Living people
Brazilian footballers
Association footballers not categorized by position
Brazilian football managers
Sportspeople from Minas Gerais
Villa Nova Atlético Clube players
United States Virgin Islands national soccer team managers
Brazilian expatriate sportspeople in the United States